Francisco Contreras may refer to:

Francisco Contreras Valenzuela (1877–1933), Chilean writer
Francisco Contreras (athlete) (1904–1949), Mexican Olympic hurdler
Francisco Contreras (tennis) (born 1934), Mexican tennis player
Francisco Contreras (boxer) (born 1984), Dominican professional boxer
Francisco Contreras (footballer) (born 1999), Mexican footballer